This is a list of notable Bangladeshi businesspeople.

A

 Abul Kalam Azad

B

 Bajloor Rashid
 Bibi Russell

E

 Enam Ali

I

 Iqbal Ahmed
 Islam Mohamed Himu
 Iqbal Wahhab

J

 Jelina Berlow-Rahman
 Jahurul Islam

K

 Kutubuddin Ahmed

M

 Mahee Ferdous Jalil
 M. A. Sattar
 Mirza Ahmad Ispahani
 Mirza Mehdy Ispahani
 Moosa Bin Shamsher
 Muhammad Yunus
 Muquim Ahmed
 Mustafa Jabbar

N
 Nihad Kabir
 Nitun Kundu

O

 Obaidul Karim

R

 Rafiquddin Ahmad
 Rubana Huq
 Rajeeb Samdani

S

 Syed Ahmed
 Siraj Ali
 Syed Manzur Elahi
 Shah Abdul Hamid
 Shahriar Sayeed Husain
 Shelim Hussain
 Sayeed Khokon
 Salman F Rahman
 Sara Zaker
 Samia Zaman
 Md. Shafiul Islam Mohiuddin
 Selima Ahmad

T

 Tommy Miah

W

 Wali Tasar Uddin

 
Economy of Bangladesh-related lists
Lists of businesspeople
Business